Lincoln M. Alexander Secondary School is located in the village of Malton in the city of Mississauga, Ontario (part of the Peel District School Board). It is named after the former federal cabinet minister and Lieutenant Governor of Ontario, Lincoln M. Alexander. Founded in 1968 as Westwood Secondary School, it was renamed in 2000 after it merged with Morning Star Secondary School.

After the merger the school was expanded, creating the present day Geography/Historical Studies wing. This was done in an effort to accommodate more students.

The exterior of the school is architecturally almost an exact copy of Erindale Secondary School, while their interiors remain different.

The high school is located on Morning Star Drive near the intersection of Morning Star Drive and Goreway Drive. Its location is central to the small community of Malton. As a result, it is not serviced by school buses except for the disabled. Adjacent to the high school is Malton Community Centre with its facilities such as a library.

Athletics
Lincoln has various sports teams representing the school that play under the school's mascot of a lynx.

The school is attached to the former Malton Community Pool (Operated by the City of Mississauga, formerly Westwood Pool), which provided many services to local residents. The pool was closed in 2011 due to the construction of the new pool across the street at the Malton Community Centre.

Lincoln has a ball hockey team which won the annual Blizzard Cup and was a finalist in OBHA in 2012. In the 2013 season, Lincoln won the annual Dragons Cup and placed second place for the second time in OBHA.

Lincoln's Media Group
Lincoln's Media Group contributes monthly to a section of The Malton Mirror. The Lincoln Media Group is a student-based extracurricular club that investigates and reports on events affecting Lincoln students.

See also
List of high schools in Ontario

References

External links
 Lincoln M. Alexander Secondary School

Peel District School Board
High schools in Mississauga
Educational institutions established in 1968
1968 establishments in Ontario